Shepman Run (also known as Shepmans Run) is a tributary of Little Muncy Creek in Lycoming County, Pennsylvania, in the United States. A covered bridge crosses the stream. Shepman Run is classified as a Coldwater Fishery and a Migratory Fishery.

Course

Shepman Run begins in a valley in Moreland Township. It flows east for a few tenths of a mile before turning south for several tenths of a mile. In this reach, the stream receives an unnamed tributary from the left and passes through a small pond. The stream then turns south-southwest for several tenths of a mile before reaching the end of its valley. Shortly afterwards, it turns east for a short distance before reaching its confluence with Little Muncy Creek.

Tributaries
Shepman Run has no named tributaries.

Geography and geology

The stream flows through a valley known as Tommy Hollow.

A bridge known as the Eichenlaub bridge crosses Shepman Run in Moreland Township, off Tom Hill Hollow Road (on the road's west side).

Watershed and biology
The stream is entirely within the United States Geological Survey quadrangle of Hughesville. Its mouth is located near Clarketown.

Shepman Run is in the Lower West Branch Susquehanna sub-basin.

Shepman Run is classified as a Coldwater Fishery and a Migratory Fishery, as are all of the other tributaries of Little Muncy Creek.

History
Shepman Run was entered into the Geographic Names Information System on August 2, 1979. Its identifier in the Geographic Names Information System is 1187470. The stream is also known as Shepmans Run. This variant name appears in The Geology of Lycoming County, which was written by Andrew Sherwood and Franklin Platt and published in 1880.

See also
Cox Run, next tributary of Little Muncy Creek going downstream
Laurel Run (Little Muncy Creek), next tributary of Little Muncy Creek going upstream
List of rivers of Pennsylvania

References

Rivers of Lycoming County, Pennsylvania
Tributaries of Muncy Creek
Rivers of Pennsylvania